Andrus Kivirähk (born 17 August 1970) is an Estonian writer, a playwright, topical satirist, and screenwriter. As of 2004, 25,000 copies of his novel Rehepapp ehk November (Old Barny or November) had been sold, making him the most popular 21st century Estonian writer. His book Mees, kes teadis ussisõnu (The Man Who Spoke Snakish) (2007) has been one of the top selling books in Estonia. He has been a member of the Estonian Writers' Union (in Estonian: Eesti Kirjanike Liit) since 1996.

Radio work
Andrus Kivirähk and Mart Juur host a humorous and satirical weekly radio show, Rahva Oma Kaitse (People's Own Defense), on the Raadio 2 channel of Estonian public broadcaster ERR. Every time the Eurovision Song Contest takes place, it is also aired on Raadio 2, and Juur and Kivirähk air a 'special' on top of the live broadcast.

Publications in Estonian
 Rehepapp ehk November (2000)
 Mees, kes teadis ussisõnu (2007)
Memoirs of Ivan Orav, or the Past as Azure Mountains (Ivan Orava mälestused, ehk, Minevik kui helesinised mäed), 1995
Suur Tõll (Big Toell), Varrak 2014, illustrated by Jüri Arrak

Children's books 

Tilda ja tolmuingel (Tilda and the Dust Angel), FD Distribution 2018, illustrated by Takinada
Karneval ja kartulisalat (Carnival and Potato Salad), Varrak 2015, illustrated by Heiki Ernits
Oskar ja asjad (Oskar and the Things), Film Distribution 2015, illustrated by Anne Pikkov
Konna musi (A Frog Kiss), Varrak 2013, illustrated by Anne Pikkov
Kaka ja kevad (Poo and Spring), Varrak 2009, illustrated by Heiki Ernits
Leiutajateküla Lotte (Lotte from Gadgetville), Eesti Joonisfilm 2006, illustrated by Heiki Ernits
Limpa ja mereröövlid (Limpa and the Pirates), Varrak 2004, 2009, 2013, 2018, illustrated by Anni Mäger
Lotte reis Lõunamaale (Lotte’s Journey South), Varrak 2002; Eesti Joonisfilm 2012, illustrated by Regina Lukk-Toompere
Sibulad ja šokolaad (Onions and Chocolate), Varrak 2002, illustrated by Ivo Uukkivi (collection of children’s plays: Rich Ill Will Has No Bounds; Pill Bug and Pill Bug; Mice in the Attic; Brave Kefir)
Sirli, Siim ja saladused (Sirli, Siim and the Secrets), Varrak 1st ed. 1999, 9th ed. 2015, illustrated by Ilmar Trull
Kaelkirjak (Giraffe), Tiritamm 1995, illustrated by Anu Kalm; Tänapäev 2000, 2007, 2008, 2014, 2016, illustrated by Heiki Ernits

Awards 

 2018 Annual Children's Literature Award of the Cultural Endowment of Estonia (Tilda and the Dust Angel)
 2018 "Järje Hoidja" Award of the Tallinn Central Library (Tilda and the Dust Angel)
 2018 Good Children's Book (Tilda and the Dust Angel)
 2016 Astrid Lindgren Memorial Award candidate
 2016 Tartu Prize for Children's Literature (Childhood Prize) (Oskar and the Things)
 2016 Eduard Vilde Literary Award (Oskar and the Things)
 2016 Nukits Competition, 2nd place (Carnival and Potato Salad)
 2015 Good Children's Book (Oskar and the Things)
 2015 The White Ravens (Big Toell)
 2013 Jānis Baltvilks Prize (Jāņa Baltvilka balva), Latvia (Poo and Spring)
 2013 Good Children's Book (A Frog Kiss)
 2012 Astrid Lindgren Memorial Award candidate
 2011 Jānis Baltvilks Prize (Jāņa Baltvilka balva), Latvia (Lotte from Gadgetville)
 2010 Nukits Competition, 1st place (Poo and Spring)
 2010 Children and Young Adult Jury (Bērnu un jauniešu žūrija), Latvia, 2nd place (Grades 5–7) (Sirli, Siim and the Secrets)
 2008 IBBY Honour List (Lotte from Gadgetville)
 2008 Nukits Competition, 1st place (Lotte from Gadgetville)
 2007 Republic of Estonia State Culture Award for 2006 Creative Achievements (Lotte from Gadgetville, and plays)
 2006 Nukits Competition, 1st place (Limpa and the Pirates)
 2005 Estonian Children's Literature Centre Raisin of the Year Award (Bed-time stories for Estonian fathers, together with the collection's other authors)
 2004 The Order of the White Star, V class
 2004 Nukits Competition, 2nd place (Lotte's Journey South)
 2004 "Järje Hoidja" Award of the Tallinn Central Library (Limpa and the Pirates)
 2000 Annual Cultural Endowment of Estonia Award (animated feature film Lotte, together with Heiki Ernits, Janno Põldma, Regina Lukk-Toompere and Olav Ehala)

Translations

Dutch 

  De man die de taal van slangen sprak. (Prometheus, 2015)

English 

 The Man Who Spoke Snakish (Grove Press Atlantic 2015)

Finnish 

 Kun Musti muni mummon (Carnival and Potato Salad, selected stories, WSOY 2018)
 Koiranne alkaa kohta kukkia (Poo and Spring), Otava 2016
 Keksijäkylän Lotta (Lotte from Gadgetville, Otava 2008)
 Riihiukko (Old Barny, Otava 2000), translated by Kaisu Lahikainen

French 

 L'Homme qui savait la langue des serpents (The Man Who Spoke Snakish, Le Tripode 2013)
 Le Papillon (The Butterfly, Le Tripode 2017)
 Les Groseilles de novembre (Le Tripode 2014)

German 

 Frösche küssen (A Frog Kiss, Willegoos 2015)
 Der Schiet und das Frühjahr (Poo and Spring, Willegoos 2015)
 Der Mann, der mit Schlangen sprach (The Man Who Spoke Snakish, Klett-Cotta 2017)

Hungarian 

Kék vagon (Helesinine vagun, Kráter Műhely Egyesület 2005)
Sári, Samu és a titkok (Sirli, Siim and the Secrets, Cerkabella 2008)
Breviárium (Észt Intézet / Pluralica 2011)
Az ember, aki beszélte a kígyók nyelvét ( Mees, kes teadis ussisõnu, Typotex 2015)
Ördöngős idők (Rehepapp ehk november, Gondolat Kiadói Kör 2018)
Szépséges kék állat (Sinine sarvedega loom, Gondolat Kiadó, 2021)

Italian 

 Lotte. L’avventuroso viaggio al sud (Lotte’s Journey South, De Bastiani 2019)

Latvian 

 Lote no Izgudrotāju ciema (Lotte from Gadgetville, Zvaigzne ABC 2019)
 Oskars un lietas (Oskar and the Things, Liels un mazs 2018)
 Karnevāls un kartupeļu salāti (Carnival and Potato Salad, Liels un mazs 2016)
 Lotes ceļojums uz dienvidiem (Lotte’s Journey South, Zvaigzne ABC 2013)
 Kaka un pavasaris (Poo and Spring, Liels un mazs 2012)
 Sirli, Sīms un noslēpumi (Sirli, Siim and the Secrets, Liels un mazs 2009)

Lithuanian 

 Sirlė, Simas ir slėpiniai (Sirli, Siim and the Secrets, Kronta 2010)
 Žmogus, mokėjęs gyvačių kalbą (The Man Who Spoke Snakish; translated by Agnė Bernotaitė-Jakubčionienė; Vilnius: Aukso žuvys, 2020)

Low German 

 De Schiet un dat Fröhjohr (Poo and Spring, Plaggenhauer 2015)

Polish 

 Oskar i rzeczy (Oskar and the Things, Widnokrąg 2018)
Człowiek, który znał mowę węży (The Man Who Spoke Snakish, Marpress 2020, translated by Anna Michalczuk-Podlecki)

Russian 

 Оскар и вещи (Oskar and the Things, КПД 2019)
 Путешествие Лотты в тёплые края (Lotte’s Journey South, Eesti Joonisfilm 2017)
 Карнавал и картофельный салат (Carnival and Potato Salad, Varrak 2016)
 Поцелуй лягушку! (A Frog Kiss, Varrak 2014)
 Весна и какашка (Poo and Spring, Tallinn: Varrak 2010)
 Лимпа и пираты (Limpa and the Pirates, Varrak 2009)
 Лотте из Деревни Изобретателей (Lotte from Gadgetville, Eesti Päevaleht 2009)
 Жираф (Giraffe, КПД 2008)
 Сирли, Сийм и секреты (Sirli, Siim and the Secrets, КПД 2008)

Slovenian 

 Sara, Simon in skrivnosti (Sirli, Siim and the Secrets, KUD Sodobnost International 2015)

Japanese 

HEBI NO KOTOBA WO HANASHITA OTOKO published by KAWADE SHOBO SHINSHA, Publishers, translator: Ryoko Sekiguchi(Translated form French L'Homme qui savait la langue des serpents)

References

Estonian Literature Information Centre

External links
 A Brave Woman by Andrus Kivirähk

Living people
1970 births
Writers from Tallinn
Estonian male novelists
Estonian humorists
21st-century Estonian novelists
Recipients of the Order of the White Star, 5th Class